Sir Clement Cottrell-Dormer (1686–1758) was an English courtier and antiquary.

Biography
Cottrell was born in Westminster, Middlesex, England on 2 April 1686. He was the son of Sir Charles Lodowick Cotterell (1654–1710), and his first wife  Eliza, daughter of Nicholas Burwell of Gray's Inn.

On his father's death Cottrell became Master of the Ceremonies. The office of Master of the Ceremonies at the British court had been established by James I of England in 1603. The Master's duties were to receive foreign dignitaries and present them to the monarch at court. Sir Clement held that office from 1710 until 1758, during the reigns of Queen Anne, King George I and King George II.

He was also vice-president of the Society of Antiquaries. In 1734 he was described by Hearne as "a scholar and an antiquary, and well skill'd in matters of proceeding and ceremony".

On the death of his cousin, General James Dormer in 1741, Cottrell inherited the Rousham estates and assumed the additional surname of Dormer by a private Act of Parliament.

Cottrell died in Rousham, Oxfordshire, England on 13 October 1758.

Family
Cottrell married Bridget Sherborne (1696–1731)—only daughter and heir of Davenant and Mary Sherborne of Pembridge, Herefordshire—on 14 April 1716. They had two sons and five daughters who reached maturity:
Charles (1720–1779), who followed in the family footsteps and became master of the ceremonies.
Robert (died 1744), became a marine, perished at sea, and predeceased his father.
Mary (died 1753), predeceased her father.
Bridget (1719–1801), their second daughter became a maid of honour to Princess Anne.

Sir Clement's son, Sir Charles Cottrell-Dormer, who died in 1779, and grandson, Sir Clement Cottrell-Dormer, who died in 1808, each became Master of the Ceremonies. In 1900 the family was  represented by C. Cottrell Dormer, and in his library contained a valuable collection of letters and papers relating to Sir Charles Cotterell, Sir Charles Lodowick, and Sir Clement Cotterell.

Notes

References
 

Attribution
 

English courtiers
1686 births
1758 deaths
Cotterell family
Court of Anne, Queen of Great Britain
Court of George I of Great Britain
Court of George II of Great Britain